The 1973–74 Scottish Cup was the 89th staging of Scotland's most prestigious football knockout competition. The Cup was won by Celtic who defeated Dundee United in the final.

First round

Replays

Second round

Replays

Third round

Replays

Second Replays

Fourth round

Replays

Quarter-finals

Replays

Semi-finals

Replays

Final

See also
1973–74 in Scottish football
1973–74 Scottish League Cup

Scottish Cup seasons
1973–74 in Scottish football
Scot